Howe may refer to:

People and fictional characters
 Howe (surname), including a list of people and fictional characters
 Howe Browne, 2nd Marquess of Sligo (1788–1845), Irish peer and colonial governor

Titles
 Earl Howe, two titles, an extinct one in the Peerage of Great Britain and an extant one in the Peerage of the United Kingdom
 Howe baronets, two extinct titles in the Baronetage of England

Places

Antarctica
 Mount Howe, Marie Byrd Land
 Howe Glacier, Queen Maud Mountains

Australia
 Cape Howe, on the border between New South Wales and Victoria, Australia
 Lord Howe Island, Australia

Canada
 Howe Sound, British Columbia
 Howe Island, Ontario

United Kingdom
 Howe, North Yorkshire, a small village and civil parish
 Howe, Norfolk, a village and civil parish

United States
 Howe, Idaho, an unincorporated community
 Howe, Indiana, an unincorporated census-designated place
 Howe, Minneapolis, a neighborhood in the city of Minneapolis
 Howe, Nebraska, an unincorporated community
 Howe, Oklahoma, a town
 Howe, Pennsylvania, an unincorporated community
 Howe, Texas, a town
 Howe Township (disambiguation)
 Howe Caverns, New York

Elsewhere
 Île Howe, one of the Kerguelen Islands

Historic buildings

United States
 Howe House (Cambridge, Massachusetts), on the National Register of Historic Places
 Howe Building, Lowell, Massachusetts, on the National Register of Historic Places
 Howe Barn, Ipswich, Massachusetts, on the National Register of Historic Places
 Howe Tavern (College Corner, Ohio), on the National Register of Historic Places
 Wayside Inn (Sudbury), originally called the Howe Tavern, part of the Wayside Inn Historic District in Sudbury, Massachusetts

England
 Castle Howe, Kendal, Cumbria

Schools in the United States
 Howe High School (disambiguation)
 Howe Military Academy, Howe, Indiana

Other uses
 , several British warships
 Howe & Co, a firm of solicitors in London, England
 A synonym for Tumulus

See also

 
 How (disambiguation)
 Hau (disambiguation)
 Hao (disambiguation)